Neolarnaca is a genus of Orthopterans, sometimes known as 'leaf-folding crickets' in the subfamily Gryllacridinae and tribe Gryllacridini.  The recorded distribution of this genus is eastern China and Vietnam.

Species 
The Orthoptera Species File lists:
 Neolarnaca longipenna Bian & Shi, 2016
 Neolarnaca vera Gorochov, 2004
 N. vera aurelostria Bian & Shi, 2016
 N. vera nigrinotum Ingrisch, 2018
 N. vera vera'' Gorochov, 2004 - type species (locality: Tam Dao village, Vinh Phu Province, Vietnam)

References

External links

Ensifera genera
Gryllacrididae
Orthoptera of Indo-China